A tunnel cluster, more formally tunnel cluster of the cervix and cervical tunnel cluster, is a benign group of dilated endocervical glands in the cervix.  

It is significant only in that it can be confused for a malignancy, i.e. cancer.

See also
Cervical cancer

References

External links
Tunnel clusters (surgpath4u.com)

Pathology